The Producers Guild Film Award for Best Male Debut  (previously known as the Apsara Award for Best Male Debut) is given by the producers of the film and television guild as part of its annual award ceremony for Hindi films, to recognise a male actor who has delivered an outstanding performance in his debut film. While the official awards ceremony started in 2004, awards for the best male debut commenced four years later.

Winners

2000s

 2004 No award
 2005 No award
 2006 No award
 2007 No award
 2008Ranbir Kapoor – Saawariya as Ranbir Raj
 2009Imran Khan – Jaane Tu... Ya Jaane Na  as Jai Singh Rathore

2010s

 2010Jackky Bhagnani – Kal Kissne Dekha as Nihaal Singh
 2011Ranveer Singh – Band Baaja Baaraat as Bittoo Sharma
 2012Rana Daggubati – Dum Maro Dum as DJ Joki Fernandes
 2013Ayushmann Khurrana – Vicky Donor as Vicky Arora
 2014Sushant Singh Rajput – Kai Po Che! as Ishaan Bhatt
 2015Tiger Shroff – Heropanti as Bablu
 2016Kapil Sharma - Kis Kisko Pyaar Karoon as Kumar Shiv Ram Krishna

See also
Producers Guild Film Awards
Producers Guild Film Award for Best Female Debut

Producers Guild Film Awards
Film awards for male debut actors